This is a listing of monarchs in the countries of the Kalmar Union. The union monarchs who were Danish kings, met with opposition in Norway and Sweden, which opposed them by appointing their own opposing monarchs and regents.

Denmark

1387–1412: Margaret I (Margrete I)
1412–1439: Eric of Pomerania (Erik VII af Pommern)
1440–1448: Christopher III (Christoffer III af Bayern)
1448–1481: Christian I (Christian I)
1481–1513: John (Hans)
1513–1523: Christian II (Christian II)

Norway

1387–1389: Margaret (Margrete I)
1389–1442: Eric of Pomerania (Erik III av Pommern)
1442–1448: Christopher of Bavaria (Christoffer av Bayern)
1448–1449: Regents Sigurd Jonsson
1449–1450: Karl I (Karl Knutsson Bonde)
1450–1481: Christian I (Christian I)
1481–1483: Regents Jon Svaleson Smør
1483–1513: John (Hans)
1513–1523: Christian II (Christian II)

Sweden
Main articles: List of Swedish monarchs, List of Finnish monarchs
1389–1412: Margaret I (Margareta)
1396–1439: Eric of Pomerania (Erik av Pommern)
1438–1440: Charles VIII (Karl Knutsson Bonde)
1441–1448: Christopher of Bavaria (Kristoffer av Bayern)
1448–1448: Regents Bengt and Nils Jönsson Oxenstierna
1448–1457: Charles VIII (Karl Knutsson Bonde)
1457–1457: Regents Jöns Bengtsson Oxenstierna and Erik Axelsson Tott
1457–1464: Christian I (Kristian I)
1464–1465: Charles VIII (Karl Knutsson Bonde)
1465–1465: Regent Kettil Karlsson Vasa
1465–1466: Regent Jöns Bengtsson Oxenstierna
1466–1467: Regent Erik Axelsson Tott
1467–1470: Charles VIII (Karl Knutsson Bonde)
1470–1497: Regent Sten Sture the Elder (Sten Sture den äldre)
1497–1501: John (Hans)
1501–1503: Regent Sten Sture the Elder
1504–1511: Regent Svante Sture (Svante Nilsson Sture)
1512–1512: Regent Erik Trolle
1512–1520: Regent Sten Sture the Younger (Sten Sture den yngre)
1520–1521: Christian II (Kristian II Tyrann)



See also
List of Finnish rulers
List of rulers of Iceland

Kalmar Union monarchs